José Luis Sánchez Capdevila (born 12 February 1981) is a Spanish former footballer who played as a midfielder, and is the current manager of AD Alcorcón B.

Playing career
Capdevila was born in Zaragoza, Aragon. After playing three seasons in the third division (one each with AD Alcorcón, Real Madrid Castilla and Hércules CF) he signed with Pontevedra CF, where his career-best nine goals were not enough to prevent a relegation from the second level in 2005.

Capdevila subsequently moved to Real Valladolid, being an instrumental figure in the side's 2007 promotion to La Liga, scoring four goals in 35 games. However, he would feature sparingly in the 2007–08 campaign, making his competition debut on 15 September 2007 in a 1–2 away loss against Valencia CF.

In August 2008, Capdevila joined Real Murcia, recently relegated to division two. Two seasons later, as his team dropped down another level, the 29-year-old signed with another club in that tier, Xerez CD.

Managerial career
Shortly after retiring, Capdevila returned to Alcorcón and was named manager of the Cadete A squad, while also being an assistant of the Juvenil A side. Ahead of the 2021–22 campaign took over the Juvenil B before being named manager of the reserves on 23 September 2021, after Jorge Romero was appointed in charge of the first team.

Managerial statistics

Honours
Pontevedra
Segunda División B: 2003–04

Valladolid
Segunda División: 2006–07

References

External links

1981 births
Living people
Footballers from Zaragoza
Spanish footballers
Association football midfielders
La Liga players
Segunda División players
Segunda División B players
Tercera División players
Real Madrid C footballers
Real Madrid Castilla footballers
AD Alcorcón footballers
Hércules CF players
Pontevedra CF footballers
Real Valladolid players
Real Murcia players
Xerez CD footballers
Huracán Valencia CF players
Bolivian Primera División players
Club Bolívar players
Sport Boys Warnes players
Spain youth international footballers
Spanish expatriate footballers
Expatriate footballers in Bolivia
Spanish expatriate sportspeople in Bolivia
Spanish football managers
Tercera Federación managers